The Doctors Reform Society of Australia (DRS), established in 1973, is a medico-political thinktank and a medical association of medical practitioners and medical students that has advocated a range of alternative views to those of the Australian Medical Association.

Their initial focus was on universal health care or health insurance leading up to the establishment of the then "Medibank", now Medicare Australia. The DRS publishes the New Doctor journal.

References

External links
 Doctors Reform Society of Australia
 Health insurers should 'stop whinging' about Medicare shake-up DRS's support for change in Medicare levy income cut off.
 Federal Health Department overview of DRS
 ABC: Doctors' Reform Society labels Budget plan 'sick joke Especially in regard to country practice.

Medical and health organisations based in Australia
Think tanks based in Australia
Organizations established in 1973
Clubs and societies in Australia
1973 establishments in Australia